Sitana marudhamneydhal is a species of agamid lizard. It is endemic to India.

In 2021, the species Sitana attenboroughii was synonymised with S. marudhamneydhal.

References

Reptiles described in 2016
Reptiles of India
Sitana
Taxa named by Veerappan Deepak